Lewiston Mound is a prehistoric burial mound built by the indigenous peoples of the Hopewell tradition. It is located on the grounds of the Earl W. Brydges Artpark State Park, at Lewiston in Niagara County, New York.

Lewiston Mound was listed on the National Register of Historic Places in 1974.

Gallery

See also
 List of Hopewell sites

References

Point Peninsula Complex
Mounds in the United States
Archaeological sites on the National Register of Historic Places in New York (state)
Protected areas of Niagara County, New York
National Register of Historic Places in Niagara County, New York